Ameiurus is a genus of catfishes in the family Ictaluridae.  It contains the three common types of bullhead catfish found in waters of the United States, the black bullhead (Ameiurus melas), the brown bullhead (Ameiurus nebulosus), and the yellow bullhead (Ameiurus natalis), as well as other species, such as the white catfish (Ameiurus catus or Ictalurus catus), which are not typically called "bullheads".

The species known as bullheads can be distinguished from channel catfish and blue catfish by their squared tailfins, rather than forked.

Taxonomy and fossil record
Ameiurus is recognized as monophyletic, meaning it forms a natural group. It is mostly closely related to the clade formed by the genera Noturus, Prietella, Satan, and Pylodictis.

There is a sister group relationship between the species A. melas and A. nebulosus.

Species

Extant species 
There are currently seven recognized species in this genus:
 Ameiurus brunneus D. S. Jordan, 1877 (Snail bullhead)
 Ameiurus catus (Linnaeus, 1758) (White bullhead) 
 Ameiurus melas (Rafinesque, 1820) (Black bullhead) 
 Ameiurus natalis (Lesueur, 1819) (Yellow bullhead) 
 Ameiurus nebulosus (Lesueur, 1819) (Brown bullhead) 
 Ameiurus platycephalus (Girard, 1859) (Flat bullhead)
 Ameiurus serracanthus (Yerger & Relyea, 1968) (Spotted bullhead)

Extinct species 
There are currently eight recognized fossil species in this genus: The oldest, A. pectinatus, gives a minimum age estimate for the genus at approximately 30 million years, during the Oligocene.
 †Ameiurus hazenensis
 †Ameiurus lavetti
 †Ameiurus leidyi
 †Ameiurus macgrewi
 †Ameiurus pectinatus
 †Ameiurus reticulatus
 †Ameiurus sawrockensis
 †Ameiurus vespertinus

Distribution
Living species of Ameiurus catfishes are natively distributed east of the North American continental divide, from their westernmost point in central Montana, south to Texas, in streams of the Gulf of Mexico and Atlantic Coast, north to New Brunswick and Quebec, Ontario, Manitoba, and Saskatchewan.

Habitat
Bullheads live in a variety of habitats, including brackish and/or low oxygen ponds, rivers and lakes, although they are seldom stocked intentionally.  They are bottom feeders and eat virtually anything edible, including dead fish, insects, other fish, grain, fruit, crayfish and more.  Because of their limited use as for sport, they are usually caught while trying to catch other fish, and few anglers pursue them specifically.  Persons looking to catch bullheads will use the same bait as they would for channel catfish, including cut bait, chicken livers, blood-soaked meal, or other pungent baits. In the Northeastern US, bullheads are often sold to restaurants in the spring for "fish fries" by amateur fisher folk by the 5 gallon bucket load. Like all catfish, bullheads have a sense of smell that is more developed than most canines.

Description and identification
Bullheads do not get as large as the other catfishes native to North America, with average sizes in the one to two-pound range and world record sizes well under .

All three major bullheads can be confused with other catfishes by novice anglers.  Because they have an unforked tail, many people mistakenly think small flathead catfish are bullheads.  Both have the squared tail, and can have a mottled, brown appearance (in the case of the brown bullhead), but the flathead lower lip protrudes farther than its upper lip and it has a flat or "shovel" head.  They also have very different habits and habitat.

Flatheads generally eat only live things, while bullheads will freely eat dead fish or other small animals. The flathead is more likely to be found at the bottom of dams or in gravel pits, while bullheads are found more often in the more murky areas. Brown and yellow bullheads are significantly smaller.

Relationship to humans
They are considered rough fish by many, and are seldom caught for food, although they can be quite edible if caught in clear water and prepared correctly. In Minnesota, bullhead are important to commercial fishermen, who harvest  about 1 million pounds a year.
Bullheads can make excellent live bait for larger catfish species such as flathead catfish in states where legal.

On July 12, 1940, in Waterville, southern Minnesota a commercial bullhead fisherman named Bryant Baumgartner killed plainclothes game wardens Marcus Whipps, A. Melvin Holt, and Dudley Brady, who were investigating his operation.  The killings became known as The Bullhead Murders, as researched by James M. Keller for his 2012 book, “Tragedy on Fish Row: The Waterville Shootings.” Baumgartner then killed himself.

In the early 20th century local people could sell their catch for cents on the pound, more if cleaned.  Wholesalers would pack the fish for market where eager customers sought out the cheap protein.  However, Minnesota restricted its bullhead limit to 50 per day in 1939 due to concern about overfishing of bullheads with nets, and the state's wardens were actively monitoring commercial fishing operations for compliance at the time of the 1940 murders. 
 
The black bullhead flourished in waters polluted by sewers, mink farms, chicken and livestock processors, and other largely unregulated waste producers.  What wasn’t sold for human consumption, the guts, bones, skins, and heads became food for mink ranches.  Scott Mackenthun, a fisheries biologist with the Minnesota DNR, said black bullhead abundance has declined statewide the past 40 years after the Clean Water Act took effect in 1972.  The DNR unveiled a memorial to the three slain conservation wardens in June 2011 in nearby New Ulm.

References

External links
 

 
Freshwater fish of the United States
Fish of the Eastern United States
Freshwater fish genera
Taxa named by Constantine Samuel Rafinesque
Extant Oligocene first appearances